San Mauro la Bruca is a town and comune in the province of Salerno in the Campania region of south-west Italy.

Twin towns
 Grottaferrata, Italy
 Viagrande, Italy

See also
Cilento
Province of Salerno

References

External links

Cities and towns in Campania
Localities of Cilento